The Rochead Baronetcy, of Inverleith in the County of Edinburgh, was a title in the Baronetage of Nova Scotia.  It was created on 4 June 1704 for James Rochead.  The title became dormant on the death of the second Baronet in 1743.

Rochead baronets, of Innerleith (1704)
Sir James Rochead, 1st Baronet (1667–1737)
Sir John Rochead, 2nd Baronet (died 1743)

References

Dormant baronetcies in the Baronetage of Nova Scotia